Roger Clinton may refer to:

Roger Clinton Sr. (1908–1967), stepfather of U.S. President Bill Clinton
Roger Clinton Jr. (born 1956), half-brother of U.S. President Bill Clinton
Roger de Clinton (died 1148), 12th century English bishop